The Malagasy bulbul (Hypsipetes madagascariensis) is a species of songbird in the bulbul family, Pycnonotidae.  It is found on Madagascar and other regional islands in the south-western Indian Ocean.

Taxonomy and systematics 
The Malagasy bulbul was originally described in the genus Turdus. Alternative names for the Malagasy bulbul include the black bulbul, Madagascar black bulbul, and Madagascar bulbul. The alternate name 'black bulbul' should not be confused with the species of the same name, Hypsipetes leucocephalus, with which it was formerly considered as conspecific.

Subspecies
Three subspecies are currently recognized:
 H. m. madagascariensis - (Statius Müller, 1776): Found on Madagascar and the Comoro Islands
 H. m. grotei - (Friedmann, 1929): Found on the Glorioso Islands
 H. m. rostratus - (Ridgway, 1893): Found on Aldabra atoll

Gallery

References

Malagasy bulbul
Birds of the Comoros
Birds of Madagascar
Birds of Mayotte
Birds of Seychelles
Malagasy bulbul
Taxonomy articles created by Polbot